Cleo Massey (born 19 November 1993) is an Australian actress. She is best known for her portrayal of Kim Sertori in the television series H2O: Just Add Water. Massey has been performing on TV and film since the age of 11. In 2010, she was cast in the feature-length film The Little Things (2010) directed by Neil McGregor. In 2015, Cleo began a blog called Pass Around the Smile, based around living a positive life. Pass Around the Smile has since expanded into events, courses, online meditations and Positive Guidance cards.

Early life
Massey was born in Launceston, Tasmania. Her mother, Anna Waters-Massey, is an actress and acting teacher. Massey attended her classes while growing up. She has a younger brother, Joey.

Personal life
Massey got married in December 2021, to Luke Dempsey-Ceh, her partner of 10 years.

Filmography

Feature film 
 The Little Things (2010) – Young Dee
 Cortazar in Love (2018) – Irene
 Beat (2022) – Annie

Television 
 Mortified (2006) – Brittany's Cheer Squad
 Monarch Cove (2006) – Drowning Girl
 H2O: Just Add Water (2006–2010) – Kim Sertori
 The Bureau of Magical Things (2018) – Sophie

Short films 
 Futility (2010) – Jade McIntyre
 Humidity Rising (2006) – Chrissy

References

External links 
 

Actresses from Tasmania
Australian television actresses
1993 births
Living people
People from Launceston, Tasmania
Australian child actresses
21st-century Australian actresses